Allia Potestas was a freedwoman from the Roman town of Perugia who lived sometime during the 1st–4th centuries AD.  She is known only through her epitaph, found on a marble tablet in Via Pinciana, Rome in 1912.  The inscription, considered to be one of the most interesting of Latin epitaphs, is unique because it contains both typical epitaphic information and more personal and sexual details.

Epitaph 
The 50-line epitaph is written in verse, mostly in dactylic hexameter.  The author appears to have been well-read, with some of the poem imitating Ovid's Tristia.  However, the majority of the poem is original in formulation.

The poem, apparently written by her lover, can be divided into three sections.  The first focuses on Allia's virtues, describing her as extremely hardworking – "always the first to rise and the last to sleep... with her woolwork never leaving her hands without reason".  The second extols her beauty with semi-erotic descriptions of her body and notes that she lived harmoniously with two lovers.  Finally, the author laments her death and promises that she "shall live as long as may be possible through [his] verses."

Significance 
The epitaph is original and rather unusual among surviving epitaphs for several reasons.  

 The open treatment of polyandry – Allia lives harmoniously with "her two young lovers", "like the model of Pylades and Orestes."
 The erotic physical description – Allia "kept her limbs smooth" and "on her snow-white breasts, the shape of her nipples was small."
 The absence of typical formulated gravestone poetry.

Most surviving epitaphs portray their subjects in a more, from a Roman perspective, ideal light.  Women in Rome were expected to be "devoted to housekeeping, child bearing, chastity, submissiveness, and the ideal of being all her life univira (one-man woman)".

Ethnicity 
Allia was probably of Greek descent. It is likely that the name Potestas, meaning "power" in Latin, was merely a translation of the Greek name Dynamis, also meaning "power".

Date 
Much controversy surrounds the exact dating of the epigraph.  Upon first discovery, the work was dated to the 3rd–4th centuries AD on paleographic grounds, and thus this date is often used.  Other stylistic and linguistic analysis suggests that the 2nd century AD is more likely.  Regardless, most scholars agree it is no older than the 1st century AD, due to the apparent Ovidian influence.

References 

Women of the Roman Empire
People from Perugia
Latin inscriptions
1st-century inscriptions